The Anthem is a music venue and auditorium in the Southwest Waterfront neighborhood of Washington, D.C.  The venue opened on October 12, 2017, with a performance opened by The Struts and headlined by the Foo Fighters.  The Anthem is part of The Wharf, a comprehensive redevelopment of the Southwest Waterfront area.

The 57,000-square-foot venue, which cost $60 million (USD), has a movable stage and backdrop that allows capacity to vary from 2,500 to 6,000. Balconies are  closer to the stage than most venues. The venue is operated by I.M.P., which also manages Washington's 9:30 Club and Lincoln Theatre and Maryland's Merriweather Post Pavilion. The Anthem also hosts conventions.

Concerts

In its first few months of operation, the venue hosted musical acts including Lorde, Meek Mill, The National, The War on Drugs, Greensky Bluegrass, GRiZ, Phoenix, Courtney Barnett & Kurt Vile, The Killers, Tegan and Sara, Erykah Badu, Bob Dylan, Judas Priest, Noel Gallagher, Queens of the Stone Age, David Byrne, LCD Soundsystem, Pentatonix, Fantasia Barrino, Thievery Corporation, Phil Lesh, and Little Big Town.

Jack White filmed Jack White: Kneeling At The Anthem D.C., his first concert film as a solo artist, at The Anthem on May 30, 2018. It was released exclusively on Amazon Prime Video on September 21, 2018, with an accompanying live EP on Amazon Music.

References

External links 
 Official site

Music venues in Washington, D.C.
2017 establishments in Washington, D.C.
Washington Justice
Esports venues in Washington, D.C.
Southwest Waterfront